Leionema scopulinum, is an upright shrub with glossy, dark green, narrow leaves and yellow flowers from autumn to spring. It is found in the  Wollemi National Park in New South Wales.

Description
Flowering occurs from April to September.

Taxonomy
This species was first formally described in 2004 by Bryony M. Horton and Darren M. Crayn and the description was published in the journal Telopea.

Distribution and habitat
Leionema scopulinum has a restricted distribution only found  in the Wollemi National Park in New South Wales growing in heath and woodland in shallow sandy soils.

References

scopulinum
Sapindales of Australia
Flora of New South Wales
Plants described in 2004